Charlie & Co. (also known as Charlie & Company) is an American sitcom that originally aired on CBS from September 18, 1985 to May 16, 1986. Created by Allan Katz, the series stars Flip Wilson and Gladys Knight. Charlie & Co. is regarded as CBS's answer to The Cosby Show, which was a ratings success for NBC at the time. Unlike The Cosby Show, which ran for eight seasons, Charlie & Co. lasted only one.

Synopsis
The series follows a middle class African American family who lived on the South Side of Chicago.

Charlie Richmond (Flip Wilson) is a black middle-class employee of the Division of Highways, who juggled his work and home life with his  wife, Diana, a schoolteacher played by Gladys Knight. The couple had three children: sixteen-year-old "Junior" (Kristoff St. John), fifteen-year-old Lauren (Fran Robinson), and nine-year-old Robert (Jaleel White). Della Reese joined the cast during the latter half of the first season as Charlie's sister-in-law, Aunt Rachel.

CBS cancelled the series in May 1986.

Cast
Flip Wilson as  Charles "Charlie" Richmond
Gladys Knight as  Diana Richmond
Kristoff St. John as  Charlie "Junior" Richmond, Jr.
Fran Robinson as  Lauren Richmond
Jaleel White as  Robert Richmond
Della Reese as  Aunt Rachel (1986)
Ray Girardin as  Walter Simpson
Richard Karron as  Milton Bieberman
Kip King as  Ronald Sandler
Terence McGovern as  Jim Coyle
Eddie Velez as  Miguel Santana
Heidi Levine as  Emily Coyle

Episodes

Awards and nominations

References

External links 

1985 American television series debuts
1986 American television series endings
1980s American black sitcoms
CBS original programming
English-language television shows
Television series about families
Television series by 20th Century Fox Television
Television shows set in Chicago